Karine Costa (born 1977 in Paris) is a French singer, particularly known for her songs from Disney films.

Musical career
She is the singing voice of Jasmine in the animated film Aladdin, produced by Disney studios and released in 1992. She has recorded "Ce Rêve bleu" (the French adaptation of "A Whole New World") in duet first with Paolo Domingo, then with Daniel Lévi (#3 in France), and "Tombé du ciel" with Emmanuel Dahl. She has also recorded the song "C'est la vie" for the film Bambi 2. She had a hit with her own version of Burt Bacharach's song, "I Say a Little Prayer" (made famous by Dionne Warwick) that is currently used in France in the TV advert for the Crédit mutuel.

Discography

Albums
 1995 : Seventeen
 1998 : Disney Party Album (10 Tubes Endiablés Pour Faire La Fête)

Singles

References

1977 births
Living people
Singers from Paris
Costa, Karine
21st-century French singers
21st-century French women singers